Mount Qingyuan is a mountain and national park protecting it, Fujian Province, located in the East China region of China.

Geography

National park
It includes three major scenic features, the namesake Mount Qingyuan, and Mount Ling and Mount Jiuri.

History
Mount Qingyuan has been famous since the Tang dynasty of Imperial China. The earliest mention of Mount Qingyuan is from around 221-207 BCE. Rapid development of Mount Qingyuan began in 618-1279 CE, and reached its peak during 1297 to 1911.

The centuries of development on Mount Qingyuan has imprinted various important historical and cultural artifacts. Such examples include nine huge Taoist and Buddhist stone sculptures, 600 stone inscriptions, and 3 granite stones. This includes the "Four Superlatives": the stone statue of Laozi; the stone statues of Buddha for Three Lives; the holy Islamic tombs; and the "pray for wind stone" inscriptions.
The site also contains the shrine of Master Honyi.

The statue of Laozi is famed as being the largest stone carving of him made during the Song Dynasty. It is a Major Historical and Cultural Site Protected at the National Level; and measures 8.01m in length, 6.85m in width, and 5.63m in height, occupying an area of 55 square metres.

in 2021 The wind-praying inscriptions on Mount Jiuri were inscribed on the UNESCO World Heritage List because of its medieval religious importance and its testimony to the global maritime trade that centered on Quanzhou in the Song and Yuan dynasties.

See also

Mountains of China

References

External links
Official Mount Qingyuan website
Quanzhou city government website

Qingyuan
National parks of China
Tourist attractions in Quanzhou